Stjepan Ostojić (born 7 May 1975) is a Croatian former footballer who played as a midfielder.

Playing career
During his professional career he mainly played for Rijeka in Croatia's Prva HNL and for Pomorac. He also spent two seasons with Leoben in Austria.

Managerial career
Following his retirement from professional football, he became a manager. He managed several youth teams on the Arabian Peninsula, Rijeka, as an interim coach, Pomorac and Krk. He also worked as an assistant to manager Ivan Jurić at Hellas Verona and Genoa.

References

1975 births
Living people
Footballers from Rijeka
Association football midfielders
Croatian footballers
HNK Orijent players
HNK Rijeka players
DSV Leoben players
NK Pomorac 1921 players
NK Krk players
Croatian Football League players
2. Liga (Austria) players
Croatian expatriate footballers
Expatriate footballers in Austria
Croatian expatriate sportspeople in Austria
Croatian football managers
HNK Rijeka managers
HNK Rijeka non-playing staff
Hellas Verona F.C. non-playing staff
Croatian expatriate sportspeople in Italy